"Footsteps in the Dark" is a 1977 slow jam recorded by The Isley Brothers as an album track featured on the group's album Go for Your Guns. It was the B-side to "Groove with You", which reached number 16 on the R&B singles chart. The track also marked Ron Isley's growing transition into singing more ballads, compared to the band's earlier funk approach. The song is featured in the 2008 video game Grand Theft Auto IV on the fictional R&B radio station The Vibe 98.8.

Legacy
While the song didn't chart on the pop singles chart, it still garnered popularity initially for its weary groove, solemn lyrics, and the haunting falsetto of Ron Isley. The song would later be the basis of a sample years later first by rap group Compton's Most Wanted on their album Straight Checkn 'Em on the track "Can I Kill It?" and rapper Ice Cube, who used the musical instrumental of the song for his breakthrough hit, "It Was a Good Day". The song is noted for its unique guitar timbre which can be heard on other Isley Brother tracks, such as "Voyage to Atlantis." 

The song was again sampled by Black Milk on Slum Village's 2005 self-titled album on the track "Call Me" (which featured R&B singer Dwele), and hip-hop producer J Dilla reworked it into "Won't Do" on his posthumous album The Shining. Singer k-os used a sped-up sample from the song for his 2002 single "Heaven Only Knows", from his album Exit.

Although lesser known, the song was also sampled by Usher on his second album My Way in the song "One Day You'll Be Mine". The song is also sampled on the Rhymefest song "All Girls Cheat" from his 2006 album Blue Collar, although the portion of the song used is sung by Mario, and not a sample of the original recording. Alicia Keys heavily sampled it on her song "A Woman's Worth", recorded for her 2005 live album Unplugged. The song was also sampled by Raheem DeVaughn on "Until", a song from his debut album, The Love Experience. Thundercat's "Them Changes" from his 2015 record The Beyond / Where the Giants Roam also quotes the famous drum kit opening of the song. The song was sampled on DaniLeigh's "Do It to Me" from her debut EP The Plan.

Composition
Ernie Isley's playing on this track is heavily influenced by artists such as Jimi Hendrix, whose first recording session was actually with the Isley Brothers in 1964 with the track "Testify".

Ernie Isley not only played guitar but also played drums and wrote the lyrics to "Footsteps in the Dark". The verse of the song is written in the key of D major.

Credits and personnel
Written, composed and arranged by The Isley BrothersCo-produced by The Isley Brothers, Malcolm Cecil and Robert Margouleff

Ronald Isley – lead vocals, backing vocals
Rudolph Isley – backing vocals
O'Kelly Isley, Jr. – backing vocals
Ernie Isley – backing vocals, congas, drums, guitars, 12-string guitar
Marvin Isley – backing vocals, bass guitar
Chris Jasper – backing vocals, tambourine, piano, synthesizer

References

1977 songs
Funk ballads
The Isley Brothers songs
Songs written by Chris Jasper
Songs about infidelity
Songs about nights
Rhythm and blues ballads
Soul ballads
1970s ballads